Zehrudin Kavazović (born 16 February 1975) is a retired Bosnian-Herzegovinian professional football player.

Club career
Kavazović played for FC Anzhi Makhachkala in the Russian Premier League.

International career
He made his debut for Bosnia and Herzegovina in a January 2001 Sahara Millenium Cup match against Serbia and Montenegro in India and  made four appearances at the tournament, scoring one goal. The games were not considered full FIFA internationals.

References

External links

1975 births
Living people
People from Banovići
Association football midfielders
Bosnia and Herzegovina footballers
Bosnia and Herzegovina international footballers
FK Sloboda Tuzla players
VfL Osnabrück players
FK Budućnost Banovići players
FC Anzhi Makhachkala players
NK Čelik Zenica players
Premier League of Bosnia and Herzegovina players
Regionalliga players
Russian Premier League players
Bosnia and Herzegovina expatriate footballers
Expatriate footballers in Germany
Bosnia and Herzegovina expatriate sportspeople in Germany
Expatriate footballers in Russia
Bosnia and Herzegovina expatriate sportspeople in Russia